is a district located in Fukushima Prefecture, Japan.

As of 2008, the district has an estimated population of 29,787 and a density of 34.2 persons per km2. The total area is 870.51 km2.

Towns and villages
Aizumisato
Kaneyama
Mishima
Shōwa

Mergers
On October 1, 2005, the towns of Aizuhongō and Aizutakada and the village of Niitsuru merged to create the new town of Aizumisato.

Districts in Fukushima Prefecture
District Onuma